Chiyana (also Romanized as Chīāna; also known as Chiyana) is a village in Solduz Rural District of the Central District of Naqadeh County, West Azerbaijan province, Iran. At the 2006 National Census, its population was 2,283 in 551 households. The following census in 2011 counted 3,155 people in 906 households. The latest census in 2016 showed a population of 3,878 people in 1,152 households; it was the largest village in its rural district. The village is populated by Azerbaijanis and Kurds.

References 

Naqadeh County

Populated places in West Azerbaijan Province

Populated places in Naqadeh County
Kurdish settlements in West Azerbaijan Province